Dating The Enemy is a 1996 Australian comedy about a recently broken up couple who mystically swap bodies and have to live as each other.

Plot
One Valentine's evening a group of single, dateless friends get together to play Trivial Pursuit. Brett (Guy Pearce), a friend of the host from Melbourne, has just landed a job as presenter of a TV gossip show. He is brash and self-confident. Tash (Claudia Karvan) is a science journalist for a national newspaper, studious, intense and self-conscious. They have nothing in common, so naturally they get it together.

A year later and Brett's career is going well, there is the possibility of a job in New York and popularity has gone to his head. Tash is still trying to write serious scientific articles for a paper more interested in gossip and sex and struggling to prevent her articles being buried on page 12. Their relationship is on the rocks. That night during a Valentine's boat trip on Sydney Harbour, an argument ensues and Brett decides he has had enough and ends the relationship. Tash tells him: 'I wish you could be me, so you could see how I feel for once. I wish I could be you, so I could show you what an idiot you've become!'.

That night is a full moon and fate decides to lend a hand. They wake to find that each is in the other's body. A month of each pretending to be the other ensues and they have to learn what it's really like to be in the other person's shoes. Tash has to try to keep Brett's high-profile career on track. Brett is so bored by Tash's job, he ends up trying to make science sexy. Each learns to appreciate the other as only together can they make this enforced predicament work out.

Cast
 Guy Pearce as Brett/Tash
 Claudia Karvan as Tash/Brett
 John Howard (Australian actor) as Davis
 Matt Day as Rob

Production
The film was co-financed by French distributor Pandora Film.

Reception
One review described Dating the Enemy as: "A fast and funny look at relationships in the 90s, the smash-hit romantic comedy 'Dating the Enemy' brings a whole new meaning to the battle of the sexes."

Soundtrack
The soundtrack includes the OMC song "Right On". The original video for "Right On" features clips from the movie.

Box office
 Dating The Enemy  grossed $2,620,325 at the box office in Australia, which is equivalent to $3,668,455
in 2009 AS dollars.

See also
 It's a Boy Girl Thing, a similar movie

References

External links

Dating The Enemy at the National Film and Sound Archive
Dating the Enemy at Oz Movies

1996 films
1996 romantic comedy films
Australian romantic comedy films
Body swapping in films
Films scored by David Hirschfelder
1990s English-language films